Chris Plante (born December 12, 1959) is a syndicated radio talk show host, based at WMAL Radio in Washington D.C., and heard on the Westwood One Network.  He is also a frequent guest on both Fox News and Fox Business.

Chris Plante is the stepson of one-time CBS News White House correspondent Bill Plante.

Career

CNN 
Plante worked at CNN for 17 years, mostly covering The Pentagon and U.S. Military.   At various times at CNN, he was a Pentagon Correspondent, Senior Producer for National Security Affairs, Military Affairs Producer and an assignment editor. Plante traveled to foreign locations, including Saudi Arabia, Bosnia, Vietnam, Indonesia, Africa and the remote corners of the former Soviet Union covering stories for CNN.

Radio 
After leaving CNN, Plante got a job doing a weekend radio show at WMAL, which serves the Washington, D.C. metro area, sometimes hosting a joint show with liberal host Jerry Klein.

In 2005, Plante moved to weeknights, and in 2008 he moved to the midday time slot. In 2009, Plante's show was briefly replaced by The Joe Scarborough Show, but demand from fans saw his return to the 9 AM – Noon time slot in October 2009. Guest hosts include Mary Walter and Mike Opelka.

Plante has filled in for national hosts including Mark Levin, Michael Savage and Rush Limbaugh.

In 2016, Cumulus Media announced Plante would be nationally syndicated by Westwood One, replacing Herman Cain's program, which reverted to a local program. The Herman Cain Show would still air in the Atlanta, Jacksonville, Orlando, Tulsa, and Dayton markets.  Westwood One and Plante's home station, WMAL, are both owned by Cumulus Media.

Awards 
Plante received the Edward R. Murrow Award from the Radio Television Digital News Association (RTNDA) for his reporting from the Pentagon during the terrorist attacks on September 11, 2001.

In 2015, Plante won a Reed Irvine Award for Excellence in Journalism.

References

Living people
American radio DJs
American talk radio hosts
1959 births